In anatomy, extension is a movement of a joint that increases the angle between two bones or body surfaces at a joint. Extension usually results in straightening of the bones or body surfaces involved. For example, extension is produced by extending the flexed (bent) elbow.  Straightening of the arm would require extension at the elbow joint. If the head is tilted all the way back, the neck is said to be extended.

Extensor muscles

Upper limb
of arm at shoulder
Axilla and shoulder
Latissimus dorsi
Posterior fibres of deltoid
Teres major
of forearm at elbow
Posterior compartment of the arm
Triceps brachii
Anconeus
of hand at wrist
Posterior compartment of the forearm
Extensor carpi radialis longus
Extensor carpi radialis brevis
Extensor carpi ulnaris
Extensor digitorum
of phalanges, at all joints
Posterior compartment of the forearm
Extensor digitorum
Extensor digiti minimi (little finger only)
Extensor indicis (index finger only)
of phalanges, at interphalangeal joints
Lumbricals of the hand
Dorsal interossei of the hand
Palmar interossei
of thumb
Extensor pollicis brevis (proximal phalange)
Extensor pollicis longus (distal phalange)

Lower limb

Hip
of thigh/femur at hip
Gluteus maximus
Posterior compartment of thigh
Biceps femoris
Semitendinosus
Semimembranosus

Knee
of leg at knee (L3-L4)
Quadriceps
Rectus femoris muscle
Vastus medialis
Vastus lateralis
Vastus intermedius

Toes
of toes
Extensor hallucis longus
Extensor digitorum longus
Extensor digitorum brevis
Extensor hallucis brevis

See also

List of flexors of the human body

References

Anatomical terms of motion